Reynaldo Cunill Infañte (born April 29, 1961) is a Cuban sprint canoer who competed in the early 1980s. At the 1980 Summer Olympics in Moscow, he finished sixth in the K-2 1000 m event while being eliminated in the semifinals of the K-2 500 m event.

References
Sports-Reference.com profile

1961 births
Canoeists at the 1980 Summer Olympics
Place of birth missing (living people)
Cuban male canoeists
Living people
Olympic canoeists of Cuba